Emperor Charles is a 1921 Austrian silent film directed by Hans Otto and starring Josef Staetter, Louise Seemann, and Grit Haid. It portrays the life of Charles I of Austria, the last ruler of the Austro-Hungarian Empire.

Cast
 Josef Staetter as Kaiser Karl I
 Louise Seemann
 Grit Haid

References

Bibliography

External links

1921 films
Films directed by Hans Otto
Austrian silent feature films
Films set in Vienna
Austrian black-and-white films